Maozhou or Mao Prefecture (634–1913) was a zhou (prefecture) in imperial China located in modern northern Sichuan, around modern Mao County. From 742 to 758 it was called Tonghua Commandery.

Situated near the Tibetan frontier, it occasionally fell under Tibetan control.

Geography
The administrative region of Maozhou in the Tang dynasty is in modern northern Sichuan. It probably includes modern:
Under the administration of Ngawa Tibetan and Qiang Autonomous Prefecture:
Mao County
Wenchuan County
Under the administration of Mianyang:
Beichuan Qiang Autonomous County

References
 

Prefectures of the Tang dynasty
Prefectures of the Song dynasty
Former prefectures in Sichuan
Prefectures of Later Tang
Prefectures of Later Shu
Prefectures of Former Shu
Prefectures of the Yuan dynasty
Subprefectures of the Ming dynasty
Departments of the Qing dynasty